De Beck or DeBeck is a surname. Notable people with this surname include:

Billy DeBeck (1890–1942), American cartoonist
Erik De Beck (born 1951), Belgian long-distance runner
Jean de Beck (1588–1648), soldier and governor of the Duchy of Luxembourg and of the County of Chiny

See also
Beck (surname)